The New Ohio Theatre is a performance venue in the West Village of New York City. Located at 154 Christopher Street, the theater was established by Robert Lyons as the SoHo Think Tank in 1994. After losing the lease on his Soho space for the Ohio Theater in 2010, Lyons moved to the Archive building in the West Village. It is an Off-Off-Broadway theater.

On February 13, 2023, the New Ohio announced that it would close at the end of its current season on August 31, 2023. The space would remain a home for non profit theatre.

References

Theatres in Manhattan

Christopher Street
Greenwich Village
West Village